Patricia Anne Morgan (also known as Patricia Anne Glavocich, born 12 March 1939 – died 1986?) was an American businesswoman and former sex worker who became, in the early 1960s, one of the earliest people to undergo gender reassignment surgery in the United States.

She was one of the patients of the pioneering surgeon Elmer Belt. In 1973, she published her autobiography, The Man-Maid Doll, in which she describes her experience of early experimental surgery in detail.

References

External links 
 Patricia Glavocich grave site (unconfirmed) at Findagrave.com

American women in business
American prostitutes
Transgender sex workers
1939 births
Year of death missing
Place of birth missing
Transgender women
LGBT people from New Jersey